Acrochaete is a genus of marine green algae of the family Ulvellaceae known to live as endoparasites of other algae, although they may eventually be found growing on inorganic substrates, such as rocks.

Description 
Species of Acrochaete are small prostrate and filamentous algae with irregularly branched filaments. The cells produce hyaline hairs, which are considered a diagnostic character of the genus.

References

External links 

Ulvales
Ulvophyceae genera
Endoparasites